Beach Station a national historic district located near Chesterfield, in Chesterfield County, Virginia. The district includes six contributing buildings and one contributing site in the Village of Beach.  They were all constructed about 1890 and are two single-family dwellings, a post office, a railway depot, an outbuilding, two railroad shanties, and the ruins of the former general store. Beach Station was accessible from the Farmville and Powhatan Railroad later named the Tidewater and Western Railroad.  Leasing arrangements had been made with the Brighthope Railway company which was sold to become the Farmville and Powhatan.   The district represents an unusual collection of late-nineteenth-century buildings in their historic surroundings.
It was listed on the National Register of Historic Places in 2008.

References

Historic districts in Chesterfield County, Virginia
Houses completed in 1890
National Register of Historic Places in Chesterfield County, Virginia
Commercial buildings completed in 1890
Railway stations in the United States opened in 1890
Historic districts on the National Register of Historic Places in Virginia
Railway stations on the National Register of Historic Places in Virginia